This is a list of association football clubs in Thailand.

Thai League 1 
 Bangkok United 
 BG Pathum United 
 Buriram United
 Chiangrai United 
 Chonburi 
 Khon Kaen United
 Lampang
 Lamphun Warriors
 Muangthong United 
 Nakhon Ratchasima 
 Nongbua Pitchaya
 Police Tero
 Port 
 PT Prachuap
 Ratchaburi Mitr Phol
 Sukhothai

Thai League 2 
 Ayutthaya United
 Chainat Hornbill
 Chiangmai
 Chiangmai United
 Customs United
 Kasetsart
 Krabi
 Nakhon Pathom United
 Rayong
 Rajpracha
 Nakhon Si United
 Phrae United
 Ranong United
 Samut Prakan City
 Suphanburi 
 Trat
 Udon Thani
 Uthai Thani

Thai League 3

Thai League 3 Northern Region 
 Chiangrai City
 Chiangrai Lanna
 Kamphaengphet
 Maejo United
 Nakhon Mae Sot United
 Nan
 Northern Tak United
 Phitsanulok
 See Khwae City
 Uthai Thani
 Uttaradit
 Wat Bot City

Thai League 3 North Eastern Region 
 Khon Kaen Mordindang
 Mahasarakham
 Mashare Chaiyaphum
 Muang Loei United
 Nakhon Ratchasima United
 Sakon Nakhon
 Sisaket
 Sisaket United
 Surin City
 Surin Khong Chee Mool
 Ubon Kruanapat
 Udon United
 Yasothon

Thai League 3 Eastern Region 
 ACDC
 Assawin Kohkwang United
 Banbueng
 Bankhai United
 Chachoengsao Hi-Tek
 Chanthaburi
 Marines Eureka
 Pattaya Dolphins United
 Pluakdaeng United
 Royal Thai Fleet
 Saimit Kabin United
 Sakaeo

Thai League 3 Western Region 
 Angthong
 Assumption United
 Bang Pa-in Ayutthaya
 Chainat United
 Hua Hin City
 Kanchanaburi
 Kanjanapat
 Pathumthani University
 Samut Songkhram
 Saraburi United
 Thawi Watthana Samut Sakhon United

Thai League 3 Bangkok Metropolitan Region 
 Bangkok
 Chamchuri United
 Grakcu Sai Mai United
 Inter Bangkok
 Kasem Bundit University
 Nonthaburi United S.Boonmeerit
 North Bangkok University
 Prime Bangkok
 Royal Thai Air Force
 Royal Thai Army
 Samut Prakan
 Siam
 STK Muangnont
 Thonburi United

Thai League 3 Southern Region 
 Jalor City
 Krabi
 MH Khon Surat City
 Nakhon Si United
 Nara United
 Patong City
 Pattani
 Phatthalung
 Satun United
 Songkhla
 Surat Thani
 Trang
 Young Singh Hatyai United

Thailand Semi-Pro League

Thailand Semi-Pro League Northern Region

Thailand Semi-Pro League North Eastern Region

Thailand Semi-Pro League Eastern Region

Thailand Semi-Pro League Western Region

Thailand Semi-Pro League Bangkok Metropolitan Region

Thailand Semi-Pro League Southern Region

Thailand Amateur League

Thailand Amateur League Northern Region

Thailand Amateur League North Eastern Region

Thailand Amateur League Eastern Region

Thailand Amateur League Western Region

Thailand Amateur League Bangkok Metropolitan Region

Thailand Amateur League Southern Region

By provinces

Withdrawn/Suspended Clubs 
Inter Pattaya
Lopburi
Phetchaburi
Saraburi
Thamrongthai

Former Clubs 
Airforce Training College
Ayutthaya Warrior (2016-2017)
Bangkok Bank (1955-2008)
Bangkok Bank of Commerce
BBCU (1976-2017)
J.W. Police (2004-2016)
Krung Thai Bank (1977-2009)
Pattaya United (1989-2018)
Phuket (2009-2017)
Police Cadet Academy
Police United (1960-2017)
Raj-Vithi (1968-2015)
RBAC (1998-2016)
Thai Farmers Bank (1987-2000)
TOT (1954-2016)
TTM (1963-2016)

See also 
 Thai football records and statistics
 Thai clubs in the Asian Club Championship
 Thai clubs in the AFC Champions League
 Thai clubs in the AFC Cup
 List of women's football clubs in Thailand

Thailand
 
clubs
Football clubs